De Barsy syndrome is a rare autosomal recessive genetic disorder. Symptoms include cutis laxa (loose hanging skin) as well as other eye, musculoskeletal, and neurological abnormalities. It is usually progressive, manifesting side effects that can include clouded corneas, cataracts, short stature, dystonia, or progeria (premature aging).

It was first described in 1967 by De Barsy et al. and, as of 2011, there have been 27 cases reported worldwide. The genes that cause De Barsy syndrome have not been identified yet, although several studies have narrowed down the symptoms' cause. A study by Reversade et al. (2009) has shown that recessive mutations in PYCR1 or ALD18A1, the genetic sequences that codes for mitochondrial enzymes that synthesize L-proline, are prevalent in cases of autosomal recessive cutis laxa (ARCL), a condition very similar to De Barsy syndrome. A study by Leao-Teles et al. has shown that De Barsy syndrome may be related to mutations in ATP6V0A2 gene, known as ATP6V0A2-CDG by the new naming system.

Alternative names for De Barsy syndrome include corneal clouding-cutis laxa-mental retardation, cutis laxa-growth deficiency syndrome, De Barsy–Moens–Diercks syndrome, and progeroid syndrome of De Barsy.

References

External links 

 De Barsy Syndrome at the United States National Library of Medicine
 De Barsy Syndrome at the National Organization for Rare Disorders

Genetic diseases and disorders
Autosomal recessive disorders
Progeroid syndromes
Rare syndromes